Gibbula podolica is a species of sea snail, a marine gastropod mollusk in the family Trochidae, the top snails.

This species is only known as a fossil from the Middle Miocene of Austria, in the age range between 12.7 Ma and 11.608 Ma. This snail appears to have been an epifaunal grazer in the offshore zone.

A study by M. Harzhauser and T. Kowalke (2002) placed this species in the genus Gibbula.

References

podolica